Limiting membrane may refer to:

 External limiting membrane
 Internal limiting membrane
 Glial-limiting membrane